Sir Thomas John Mellis Napier  (24 October 1882 – 22 March 1976) was an Australian judge and academic administrator. He was a judge of the Supreme Court of South Australia between 28 February 1924 and 28 February 1967, Chief Justice of South Australia from 25 February 1942 until 28 February 1967 and Chancellor of the University of Adelaide.

Early life
He was born in Dunbar in East Lothian to Dr. Alexander Disney Leith Napier FRSE and his wife Jessie Mellis. The family moved to London in 1887, where he attended the City of London School, and emigrated to Australia in 1896, Dr. Alexander Napier having taken the post of senior resident physician at the Adelaide Hospital.

He studied law at the University of Adelaide graduating LLB in 1902. In 1903 he became Managing Clerk for "Kingston & McLachlan" and became a partner with McLachlan in 1906.

Legal career
In 1912 (together with Thomas Poole) he resuscitated the Law Society of South Australia, and served as its Vice President in 1923. On 30 April 1942 he was appointed Lieutenant-Governor of South Australia.

He was knighted in 1943 and became a Knight Commander of the Order of St Michael and St George in 1945. He was appointed a Knight of the Venerable Order of St John in 1949.

In 1964, Napier presided over the trial of Glen Sabre Valance, the last man hanged in South Australia. Valance was also the second-to-last man to be executed in Australia overall.

He died on 22 March 1976 at Kingswood, South Australia and, following a state funeral, was cremated.

Personal life
On 24 October 1908 Napier married Dorothy Bell Kay (died 1959) at Walkerville. They had three sons, one of whom was killed whilst serving with the Royal Australian Air Force in 1944.

Honours

 Knight Bachelor (1943).
 Knight Commander of the Order of St Michael and St George (KCMG; 1945).
 King George V Silver Jubilee Medal (1935).
 King George VI Coronation Medal (1937).
 Queen Elizabeth II Coronation Medal (1953).
 Knight of the Venerable Order of St John of Jerusalem (KStJ; 1949).
 The Napier Mountains were named by Sir Douglas Mawson after Sir Mellis Napier. The Napier Mountains were first charted in January 1930 by the British Australian New Zealand Antarctic Research Expedition under Mawson.
 The South Australian Electoral district of Napier, from 1977 to 2018.
His bust by John Dowie stands near the gates of Government House in Adelaide.

References

1882 births
1976 deaths
People from Dunbar
Australian King's Counsel
Chancellors of the University of Adelaide
Chief Justices of South Australia
Australian Knights Commander of the Order of St Michael and St George
Australian Knights Bachelor
Knights of the Order of St John
Lawyers from Adelaide
Adelaide Law School alumni
Lieutenant-Governors of South Australia
Australian royal commissioners
Judges of the Supreme Court of South Australia
20th-century Australian judges